Mass No. 2 in G major,  167, by Franz Schubert was composed in less than a week in early March 1815 and remains the best known of his three short settings, or missae breves, dating between his more elaborate No. 1 and No. 5. Apart from some passages for soprano, its solistic interventions are modest; Schubert, characteristically, inclines toward a devotional mood. The First Mass had been successfully performed in the composer's parish the year before.

Scoring and editions
The Second was originally modestly scored, requiring only a string orchestra and organ in addition to the soprano, tenor and bass soloists and the choir. It was not printed until 1845, some years after Schubert's death, and until then remained one of his less-noted compositions (so much so that that first edition was usurped by one by Robert Führer, director of music at Prague's St. Vitus Cathedral, a man who eventually landed in prison for embezzlement). But a 1980s discovery at Klosterneuburg of a set of parts dated later than Schubert's full score suggests that his final thoughts about the work were on a grander scale, with trumpet and timpani parts added and minor changes throughout. (The discovery led to recordings of the work by Sony Classical and Carus Classics, in 1995 and 1996 respectively, and to Carus-Verlag's publishing of the enhanced score.) Separately, Schubert's brother Ferdinand wrote parts for woodwinds, brass and timpani in response to the work's popularity.

Structure

The mass consists of six movements. Performances require approximately 22 minutes.

"" , G major, 3/4
"" , D major, common time
"" , G major, cut common time
"" , D major, common time
"..." Allegro, 2/4
"" , G major, 6/8; soprano, tenor and bass soloists in canon 
"..." D major, Allegro,  2/4
"" , G major, common time

Recordings
1989 — Dawn Upshaw (sop.), David Gordan (ten.), William Stone (bass), Atlanta Symphony Chamber Chorus, Atlanta Symphony Orchestra, no organ, Robert Shaw — Telarc 80212
live in 1990 — Barbara Bonney (sop.), Jorge Pita (ten.), Andreas Schmidt (bass), Wiener Staatsopernchor, Chamber Orchestra of Europe, Katrine Bryndorf (organ), Claudio Abbado — Deutsche Grammophon 435 486-2
Sept. 20-27, 1995 — Thomas Puchegger (boy sop.), Jörg Hering (ten.), Harry van der Kamp (bass), Wiener Sängerknaben, Chorus Viennensis, Orchestra of the Age of Enlightenment, Arno Hartmann (organ), Bruno Weil — Sony Classical SK 68247
April 1996 — Edith Lienbacher (sop.), Alexander Kaimbacher (ten.), Anton Scharinger (bass), Wiener Kammerchor, Orpheus Orchester Wien, Martin Nowak (organ), Johannes Prinz — Carus Classics 83.317
live on Dec. 23, 2000 — Tatiana Lisnic (sop.), Cesare Catani (ten.), Ildebrando d’Arcangelo (bass), Coro del Teatro alla Scala, Orchestra del Teatro alla Scala, organist unknown, Riccardo Muti — RAI-TV, no catalog number
live on March 29, 2007 — Luba Orgonášová (sop.), Christian Elsner (ten.), Gustáv Beláček (bass), Chor des Bayerischen Rundfunks, Symphonie-Orchester des Bayerischen Rundfunks, organist unknown, Mariss Jansons — BR Klassik 900114

External links

 
 

Masses by Franz Schubert
Music for orchestra and organ
1815 compositions
Compositions in G major